Oumou Kone (born 20 December 1999) is a Malian footballer who plays as a forward for Super Lionnes and the Mali women's national team.

Early years
Oumou Kone was born on 20 December 1999.

International career
Kone capped for Mali at senior level during the 2014 Africa Women Cup of Nations qualification.

In July 2022, Kone scored two goals and assisted on a third, to beat Netherlands 3–1 at the 2022 CISM World Military Women's Soccer Championship in Spokane, Washington, United States.

References

1999 births
Living people
Malian women's footballers
Mali women's international footballers
Women's association football forwards
21st-century Malian people